Wrangler is an American Western television series starring Jason Evers that aired on the NBC television network from August 4 to September 15, 1960.

In Wrangler, Evers played Pitcairn, a wrangler who roamed the Old West, finding adventures along the way. However, Wrangler did not have much of a chance to find adventure because the series lasted only for six episodes. It was a summer replacement series for The Ford Show Starring Tennessee Ernie Ford, but did not garner high enough ratings to become a full-fledged series.

"Wrangler" stood out among westerns chiefly because it was the first of its genre to be videotaped rather than filmed. It earned an Emmy nomination for Outstanding Achievement in Electronic Camerawork in 1961.

Guest stars included Tyler McVey in the episode "Incident at the Bar M." UCLA has preserved that episode in its Film and Television Archive.

Three years after Wrangler, Evers landed the lead in the 26-episode ABC drama Channing, set on a fictitious college campus.

References

 McNeil, Alex. Total Television  (1996). New York: Penguin Books 
 Brooks, Tim and Marsh, Earle, The Complete Directory to Prime Time Network and Cable TV Shows (1999). New York: Ballantine Books

External links
  Wrangler at The Internet Movie Database
 

1960s Western (genre) television series
1960 American television series debuts
1960 American television series endings
NBC original programming
1960s American drama television series